Lakshmy Ramakrishnan is an Indian actress, director and philanthropist. She made her debut in the Malayalam film Chakkara Muthu (2006), and has since appeared primarily in supporting roles in Tamil films.

Personal life 
Lakshmy was born and raised in a Tamil Brahmin family in Palakkad, Kerala. She got engaged at the age of 16 and got married when she was 18 years old.

Career
Ramakrishnan ran an event management business in Muscat, Oman from 1992 to 2001, before returning to India and acting and directing films. Director A. K. Lohithadas offered her a supporting role in his next film. Karu Pazhaniappan's Pirivom Santhippom (2008) in which she played the character of Sneha's mother was her first Tamil film, following which she played supporting roles in numerous films. She portrayed an angry mother who wants to avenge her daughter's death in Mysskin's Yuddham Sei (2011). She also tonsured her head for the "once-in-a-lifetime role".

She has worked in television shows. She acted in the serial Aval in STAR Vijay and hosted 1500 episodes of the reality show Solvathellam Unmai in Zee Tamil. She has featured in more than 25 TV Commercials.

In 2012, she completed her first feature film, Aarohanam, acclaimed for the sensitive portrayal of mental illness, which received a Special Jury award at the 7th Vijay Awards. Her 4th directorial venture, House Owner, has been selected as one of the only two Tamil movies to be screened at the flagship component of the IFFI, Indian Panorama (Goa, 2019).

Filmography 

As director

As actress

Television

Awards and nominations

References

External links 
 Riding the Crest
 

Indian film actresses
Tamil actresses
Actresses from Chennai
Living people
Actresses in Malayalam cinema
Indian women film directors
Actresses in Malayalam television
Indian television actresses
Actresses in Tamil cinema
21st-century Indian actresses
21st-century Indian film directors
Actresses in Tamil television
Film directors from Chennai
Tamil film directors
Actresses in Telugu cinema
Actresses in Hindi cinema
Year of birth missing (living people)